Adolphe René Bousquet (14 August 1899 – 17 March 1972) was a French rugby union player who competed in the 1920 Summer Olympics and in the 1924 Summer Olympics. He was born in Béziers and died in Béziers. He won the silver medal as member of the French team in 1920 as well as in 1924.

References

External links
profile

1899 births
1972 deaths
Sportspeople from Béziers
French rugby union players
Olympic rugby union players of France
Rugby union players at the 1920 Summer Olympics
Rugby union players at the 1924 Summer Olympics
Olympic silver medalists for France
France international rugby union players
Medalists at the 1924 Summer Olympics
Medalists at the 1920 Summer Olympics
AS Béziers Hérault players
20th-century French people